Deutsche Schule Rio de Janeiro is a German international school in Botafogo, Rio de Janeiro, Brazil. It serves levels Kindergarten/Educação Infantil through klasse 12/turma 12 (a part of Sekundarstufe II, or senior high school/sixth form). It is located in the former US Embassy.

There are two divisions: a German division and a Brazilian division. The German division, used by Brazilians already speaking German and German expatriates, has about two-thirds of its classes taught in German. In the Brazilian division about one third of the classes are taught in German. The German government gives support and 15 teachers from Germany are a part of the faculty.

The school was founded by Helle Tirler, in 1965.

 the monthly tuition was 2,000 Brazilian real.

See also
 German Brazilian

References

External links

  Deutsche Schule Rio de Janeiro
  Deutsche Schule Rio de Janeiro

German international schools in Brazil
European-Brazilian culture in Rio de Janeiro (city)
International schools in Rio de Janeiro (city)
Educational institutions established in 1965
1965 establishments in Brazil